Cammoro is a frazione of the comune of Sellano, in the province of Perugia, Umbria, central Italy.

At an elevation of 968 m, Cammoro is a medieval burgh (known at the times as Castrum Cammori) located on the same name mount, between Foligno, Spoleto and Norcia. In 2001 it had 17 inhabitants, much of the population having fled after the earthquake of September 26, 1997.

It has a castle built in the 13th-14th centuries, later turned into the church of Santa Maria Novella, and the Romanesque church of San Paterniano.

Frazioni of the Province of Perugia
Hilltowns in Umbria